Creature From the Black Lagoon: The Musical was a live performance show formerly located at the Universal Studios Hollywood theme park in Los Angeles, California. It debuted on July 1, 2009, replacing Fear Factor LIVE. As of March 9, 2010, this show was officially closed.
The musical at Universal Studios Hollywood was loosely based on the basic plot of the 1954 Universal film.

Plot
The show began with a clip from The Today Show with Matt Lauer, talking about the Creature. The premise was that Universal made the film based on a real creature, and a new team of explorers were on a second expedition to investigate, the principals being  Kay, Mark & David (all characters which also appeared in the original film).

Aboard the Rita, the Captain (which in this version, is an Amazonian woman - a voo-doo Shirley Bassey) leads the cast in the opening number, “Black Lagoon."

Kay vents her romantic frustrations with her fiancé in the second song, “Slay Me." The song recreates the famous "swimming sequence" from the original movie, in which Kay swims while the Creature observes her from below, tantalized.

The next song is “Prime Evil," in which everyone sings about the Creature. To the dismay of the cast, the Creature climbs onto the boat and joins the song.

The Creature kidnaps Kay and takes her back to his lair, which bears a resemblance to an underwater grotto bachelor pad.  This is where the Creature and Kay bond during their duet, "Strange New Hunger."  Mark and David, Kay's fellow scientists, rush in to save Kay. The Creature tells her his name... Gill! He gets shot with a tainted speargun, with results that soon become clear.

Back aboard the Rita, the scientists hear massive footsteps. It turns out the spear that pierced Gill had fallen into a supply of "human growth hormone" and the Creature, now 25 feet high, appears. Kay sings an encore of “Strange New Hunger," rising to the level of the Gill's face on a vine.  Before he can stop himself, the Creature eats her... and the Captain sums up the unpredictability of love with an encore of "Black Lagoon."

History
The attractions former tenant began demolition in August 2008, with construction following shortly after the same month. Set design was rumored to begin in October 2008. Construction walls were built around the attraction in December 2008. The show finally opened in July 2009.

The attraction held its grand opening debut on July 1, 2009. Julie Adams, the leading lady from the original 1954 Creature from the Black Lagoon attended the premiere.

See also
Universal Studios Hollywood
Creature From the Black Lagoon
Universal Horror
Universal Monsters
Gill-man

References

External links
Creature From the Black Lagoon- The Musical at Universal Studios Hollywood

2009 musicals
Amusement park attractions introduced in 2009
Amusement park attractions that closed in 2010
Universal Studios Hollywood
Universal Parks & Resorts attractions by name
Amusement park attractions based on film franchises
Former Universal Studios Hollywood attractions
Musicals based on films
Science fiction musicals
2009 establishments in California
2010 disestablishments in California